Congroidei is a suborder of eels in the order Anguilliformes. It contains five families:

 Derichthyidae (Longneck eels)
 Ophichthidae (Snake eels and worm eels)
 Muraenesocidae (Pike congers)
 Nettastomatidae (Duckbill eels)
 Congridae (Congers and garden eels)

References

Eels
Ray-finned fish suborders